Horacio Rivero Jr. (May 16, 1910 – September 24, 2000), was the first Puerto Rican and Hispanic four-star admiral, and the second Hispanic to hold that rank in the modern United States Navy, after the American Civil War Admiral David Glasgow Farragut (1801–1870). After retiring from the Navy, Rivero served as the U.S. Ambassador to Spain (1972–1974), and was also the first Hispanic to hold that position.

Early years
Rivero was born and raised in the city of Ponce, located in the southern coast of Puerto Rico, where he also received his primary and secondary education.

Military career
On June 20, 1927, he received an appointment from the Honorable Felix Cordova Davila, Puerto Rico's Resident Commissioner to attend the United States Naval Academy. On June 4, 1931, he graduated third in a class of 441 from the U.S. Naval Academy in Annapolis, Maryland. He earned his master's degree in electrical engineering from the Massachusetts Institute of Technology (MIT) in 1940 and in 1941 married Hazel Hooper.

World War II

For his service he was awarded the Bronze Star with Combat "V". The Pittsburghs  bow had been torn off during a typhoon and Rivero's strategies saved his ship without a single life lost. For his actions, he was awarded the Legion of Merit. He also participated in the Battle of the Santa Cruz Islands, the attack on Bougainville in the Solomons, the capture of the Gilbert Islands and a series of carrier raids on Rabaul. On June 5, 1945, Rivero participated in the first carrier raids against Tokyo during operations in the vicinity of Nansei Shoto.

Rivero served as Assistant to the Assistant Chief of Naval Operations (Special Weapons) from August 1945 to February 1946. From February 1946 to June 1947, he served as a technical assistant on the Staff of Commander Joint Task Force One for Operation Crossroads, and was on the Staff of Commander, Joint Task Force Seven during the atomic weapons tests in Eniwetok in 1948.

Korean War

Under his command, the Noble steamed to Korea to participate in the September Inchon amphibious assault. Thereafter, the Noble assisted in the transport of U.S. and foreign troops and equipment to and from the Korean combat zone. In July 1953, the Noble participated in Operation Big Switch, moving Communist North Korean prisoners from Koje Do to Inchon pursuant to the armistice agreement.

Rivero studied nuclear weaponry at the National War College and in 1954 he became Assistant Chief of Staff for Naval Operations. In 1955, he was promoted to the rank of rear admiral and was a member of the Staff of the Commander in Chief, Western Atlantic Area.

Between January 1958 and March 1959, he served as Commander Destroyer Flotilla One (COMDESFLOT ONE) headquartered in Yokosuka, Japan.

Cuban Missile Crisis

The Cuban Missile Crisis was a tense confrontation between the Soviet Union and the United States over the Soviet deployment of nuclear missiles in Cuba. On October 22, 1962, Admiral Rivero was the commander of the American fleet sent by President John F. Kennedy to set up a quarantine (blockade) of the Soviet ships in an effort to stop the Cold War from escalating into World War III. On October 28, Soviet Premier Nikita Khrushchev ordered the removal of the Soviet missiles in Cuba, and Kennedy ordered an end of the quarantine of Cuba on November 20, bringing an end to the crisis. 

Rivero was named Vice Chief of Naval Operations after the previous VCNO, Claude V. Ricketts, died in office on July 6, 1964. On July 31, 1964, Rivero became the first Puerto Rican, and the second Hispanic to become a four-star admiral in the modern era US Navy.

Vietnam War
During the Vietnam War, Rivero oversaw the day-to-day work of the Navy as the Vice Chief of Naval Operations. He was a stern supporter of a "brown-water navy," or riverine force, on the rivers of South Vietnam.

NATO commander
From 1968 until his retirement from the Navy in 1972, Admiral Rivero was the North Atlantic Treaty Organization's commander in chief of the Allied Forces in Southern Europe. He was responsible of the land, sea and air forces of five nations deployed in the Mediterranean area: Italy, Greece, Turkey, Britain and the United States. During his years as commander, some 215,000 of the 310,000 American troops in Europe were stationed in West Germany. At the time, Rivero believed that any withdrawal of United States troops from West Germany might affect the strength of the United States Sixth Fleet in the Mediterranean.

Post-Navy career
From 1972 to 1975, Admiral Rivero served as the U.S. Ambassador to Spain under the administration of President Richard M. Nixon from 1972 to 1974. Rivero was also the Honorary Chairman of the American Veterans' Committee for Puerto Rico Self-Determination.

Admiral Horacio Rivero died on September 24, 2000 and was buried with full military honors in the Fort Rosecrans National Cemetery of San Diego, California. He was survived by a daughter, two grandchildren, two great-grandchildren, and two sisters, both of Puerto Rico. On November 11, 2008, the government of Puerto Rico unveiled in the Capitol Rotunda the oil portrait of Admiral Horacio Rivero Jr.

Awards and recognitions
Among Admiral Rivero's decorations and medals were the following:

 

On April 1, 2017, the United States Navy Reserve dedicated posthumously the Navy Operational Support Center NOSC building in Fort Buchanan, Puerto Rico to Admiral Horacio Rivero Jr.

Further reading
"Puertorriquenos Who Served With Guts, Glory, and Honor. Fighting to Defend a Nation Not Completely Their Own"; by : Greg Boudonck; ;

See also

Hispanic Admirals in the United States Navy
List of Puerto Ricans
Puerto Ricans in World War II
List of Puerto Rican military personnel
Hispanics in the United States Navy
Hispanics in the United States Naval Academy

References

Further reading
"Hispanics in America's Defense" by Diane Publishing Company; Pages 88–89; Published 1997;

External links
American Veteran's Committee for Puerto Rico Self-Determination.  Retrieved  2006-10-21.

1910 births
2000 deaths
United States Navy admirals
Vice Chiefs of Naval Operations
Puerto Rican military officers
United States Navy personnel of World War II
United States Navy personnel of the Korean War
United States Navy personnel of the Vietnam War
MIT School of Engineering alumni
Hispanic and Latino American diplomats
Puerto Rican United States Navy personnel
Recipients of the Legion of Merit
Recipients of the Navy Distinguished Service Medal
United States Foreign Service personnel
United States Naval Academy alumni
Ambassadors of the United States to Spain
Burials at Fort Rosecrans National Cemetery
Military personnel from Ponce
20th-century American diplomats